Madeiral or Monte Madeiral is a mountain in the southeastern part of the island of São Vicente, Cape Verde. Its elevation is 680 meters. The village Madeiral, part of the settlement Ribeira de Calhau, lies at its northern foot.

References

Mountains of Cape Verde
Geography of São Vicente, Cape Verde